The Reformed Churches in Argentina was established in the 19th century by Dutch immigrants. They settled around Buenos Aires and Patagonia. Men and women participate in all ministries. The church has close links with the Waldesian Church – their synods have joint sessions and a joint General Assembly. The denomination has 13 congregations and 700 members. The denomination adheres to the Apostles Creed, Nicene Creed, Canons of Dort, Heidelberg Catechism and the Athanasian Creed. It is a member of the World Communion of Reformed Churches.

The Reformed Churches in Argentina united with the Evangelical Church of the River Plate in 2010.

References 

Reformed denominations in South America
Members of the World Communion of Reformed Churches